The canary rockfish (Sebastes pinniger), also known as the orange rockfish, is a species of marine ray-finned fish belonging to the subfamily Sebastinae, the rockfishes, part of the family Scorpaenidae. It is native to the waters of the Pacific Ocean off western North America.

Taxonomy
The canary rockfish was first formally described in 1864 by the American zoologist Theodore Gill with the type locality given as California. Some authorities place this species in the subgenus Rosicola. The specific name pinniger is a compound of pinnis which means "fin" and iger meaning "to bear" thought to be a reference to the longer pectoral and ventral fins of this species in comparison to the similar S. rosaceus'.

Species description

As the name suggests, this rockfish is notable for a general orange-yellow appearance, consisting of a blotchy orange pattern over a whitish or light gray background. The head has three stripes angling downwards and back, the middle one generally running across the eye, and the other two on each side of the eye. The lateral line is in a clear area. The fins are orange, with the pectoral, pelvic, and anal fins somewhat pointed and larger (thus the species epithet pinniger, meaning "I bear a large fin"). Some individuals have dark blotches on the body or dorsal fin. Maximum recorded length if 76 cm (29.6 in).

Genetics
A potential PCR-RFLP genetic sex marker developed for gopher rockfish does not successfully distinguish male and female canary rockfish.

Ecology and conservation status
Young canaries live in relatively shallow water, moving to deeper water as they mature. Adults are mostly found at depths of 80–200 meters (with two recorded at 838 meters), tending to collect in groups around pinnacles and similar high-relief rock formations, especially where the current is strong. Some off Oregon have been reported living over flat rock and mud-boulder bottoms. They may move considerable distances; one individual covered 700 km in four years after being tagged and released. Juveniles feed on small crustacea such as krill larvae (and eggs), copepods and amphipods, while adults eat krill and small fishes.

They have been an important commercial species since at least the early 1880s, with fisheries off San Francisco, California and Washington state. They are caught in trawling and hook and line operations, along with a variety of other fish such as yellowtail, lingcod, and other rockfishes. The population on the U.S. West Coast were declared overfished in 2000 and a recovery plan was implemented in 2001. This stock was declared rebuilt in 2015.

In 2007, the National Marine Fisheries Service (NMFS) received a petition to list a distinct population segment (DPS) of canary rockfish, and four other rockfishes, in Puget Sound, as an endangered or threatened species under the Endangered Species Act). (ESA). NMFS found that this petition presented enough information to warrant conducting a status review of the species. Based on the status review NMFS proposed listing this species as threatened in 2009. After a later review that included new genetic analyses, a final listing decision was made in January 2017:

References

 
 
 Milton S. Love, Mary Yoklavich, Lyman K. Thorsteinson, (2002), The Rockfishes of the Northeast Pacific'', University of California Press, pp. 234–236
 
 National Marine Fisheries Service canary rockfish webpage

Sebastes
Taxa named by Theodore Gill
Fish described in 1864